Markus Vater (born 1970 in Düsseldorf) is a German artist. He studied at the Kunstakademie Düsseldorf and the Royal College of Art, London. From 2012 to 2016 he had been teaching at the Royal College of Art in London. In 2014 he had a guestprofessorship at the Hochschule für bildende Künste Hamburg  and from 2016 to 2019 at the Staatliche Akademie der Bildenden Künste Karlsruhe. Currently he is teaching at the Hochschule der bildende Künste Essen. His studio is at Studio Voltaire. Vater lives in London and works in London and Essen.

Exhibitions, installations (selection)

Solo exhibitions (selection)
 2018 "Ich bin der Riss der durch die Welt geht", Galerie Rupert Pfab, Duesseldorf 
 2018 "What You See is not What You Look at", Kunstverein Ludwigsburg, Ludwigsburg
 2017 "Sitting in a hole that has the shape of a frightened cat", Union Gallery, London
 2016 "In einer anderen Sprache bin ich ein anderer Mensch", Orangerie Schloss Rheda Wiedenbrueck, Kunstverein Bleichhaeuschen, Rheda Wiedenbrueck
 2015 "I imagine how You imagine I imagine You", Galerie Rupert Pfab, Duesseldorf
 2014 "Wogegen ist eigentlich die Gegenwart?", Kunstverein Rostock, Rostock
 2013 "Die Unendlichkeit ist auch nicht mehr was sie mal war", Galerie Peter Zimmermann, Mannheim 
 2013 "..at the end of the world", No.82, Deptford, London
 2010 "Das Metapherproblem", Spot on 05,  Animated-Installation, Museum Kunstpalast, Düsseldorf
 2009 "Heute denke ich mich in ein Blatt hinein", Rudolf Scharpf Galerie des Wilhelm Hack Museums, Ludwigshafen am Rhein
 2008  "Briefe an die Schmetterlinge", Sies+Hoeke Galerie, Düsseldorf
 2007 "At the end of the world", art agents gallery, Hamburg
 2006 Sies + Höke Galerie, Düsseldorf
 2005 agents gallery, Hamburg
 2004 Sies + Höke Galerie, Düsseldorf
 2002 "The Dandileon-fairy-mass-suicide", Vilma Gold Gallery, London 
 2002_At the end of the world_, Escale, Düsseldorf
 2002 "Drawings and Films", Sies + Höke Gallerie, Düsseldorf
 2000 "The Hans Albers Project", SITE Ausstellungsraum, Düsseldorf
 1998 "her hands smell of architecture", Ginsa, Tokio
 1997 "Malerei", Galerie Geviert, Berlin
 1997 "Vaterboy leckt Mutterboy (mein Gehirn sagt Guten Tag)", Mehrwert, Aachen
 1996 "Wir tarnen uns für die Sintflut", Galerie 102, Düsseldorf
 1996 "Büro für konkrete Symmetrie", Künstlerhaus Dortmund, Dortmund

Group exhibitions (selection)
 2021  "Videocitta - Video Art Program 3rd Edition" at Palazzo dei Congressi, Eur district, Rome
 2020  "UNSTILLED LIFE: Artist Animations 1980-2020” at  Ron Mandos Gallery, Amsterdam 
 2019  "Zwischen Nähe und Distanz: Konstruktion von Wirklichkeiten. Von Goya bis Picasso” at the Museum Kunstpalast, Duesseldorf 
 2018  “Bild und Blick – Sehen in der Moderne" at the Wilhelm Hack Museum, Ludwigshafen
 2018  “Battalion D’Amour” curated by Sebastian Nebe at Galerie Kleindienst Leipzig
 2017 "Drawing Biennale 2017", The Drawingroom , London
 2016 "HOW TO FIND TRUE LOVE AND HAPPINESS IN THE PRESENT DAY" at Bikini Berlin, Germany
 2016 "ORBITAL EXPLORER"at Kulturforum Alte Post, Staedtische Galerie Neuss, Germany
 2016  "1. – 21. Mai 2016, Griffelkunst e.V. zur 361. und 362. Bilderwahl Editions" at Griffelkunst-Vereinigung Hamburg e.V., Hamburg
 2015 "In Schoenheit auferstehen", Galerie Patrick Ebensperger, Berlin
 2015 "A man walks into a bar...", me Collectors Room, Berlin
 2014 "Equal goes it loose", News of the world, Enclave, Deptford, London
 2014 "Hands" invited by Sven Sachsalber, Museion, Bozen, Italy
 2013 " Die Woerter in den vier Ecken", Kunstbunker, Ausstellungsraum fuer zeitgenoessische Kunst, Nuernberg
 2013 "Video Weekends", Works out of the Museums Collection, Museum Kunstpalast, Duesseldorf
 2013 "Drawing Bienale", Drawingroom, London
 2012 "I love Aldi", Wilhelm Hack Museums, Ludwigshafen am Rhein
 2012  "A Perfect day" at WestergasFabrik, Amsterdam
 2011  "Der Menschenklee", KIT, Kunsthalle Duesseldorf, Mannesmannufer, Düsseldorf
 2010  "Linea,Line,Linie", Kunstmuseum Bonn, an exhibition of the Institut für Auslandsbeziehungen
 2010  "Shudder", Drawingroom, London
 2009  "Rank"  curated by  Alistar  Robinson, Northern Gallery of Contemporary Art, Sunderland 
 2008  "Vertrautes terrain", " Streng verdaulich", curated by Ludwig Seyfarth and Gregor Jansen, ZKM, Museum fuer Neue Kunst
 2007  Black Mountain, Hans Schulte und Markus Vater, Museum Baden, Solingen
 2007  frisch gestrichen, Franz Gertsch Museum, Schweiz
 2006  Metropolis Rise: New Art from London, 798 Art District, Chaoyang District, Beijing
 2005  Goethe Abwaerts, Deutsche Jungs etc.,The Falckenberg Collection, Helsinki City Art Museum Meilahti, Helsinki, Finland
 2005  SV05,  Selected by Enrico David and Catherine Wood, Studio Voltaire, London
 2005 "Direct painting", Kunsthalle Mannhein, Mannheim
 2004  "Year Zero",Northern Gallery for Contemporary Art, Sunderland, England
 2004  "Malerei", Galerie Schoettle, Munich
 2003  "The theory of everything", with hobbypopMuseum, Galerie Ghislaine Hussenot, rue des Haudriette, Paris
 2001  "Death to the fascist insect...", Anthony D'Offay Gallery, London
 2000  "Paintings", Timothy Taylor Gallery, London
 2000   [working-title], Stanley Pricker Gallery, Kingston
 1999  "Live Marslandung", Videoinstallation, hobbypopMUSEUM, Düsseldorf
 1998  "Keep on Riding ,  volkstümliche Malerei ", Forum Kunst, Rottweil
 1996  "Drive In ", Hansaallee, Düsseldorf
 1996  "Good News ", Galerie 102, Düsseldorf

References

External links
 Homepage
 Instagram feed
 Galerie Rupert Pfab, Düsseldorf: 
 Sies + Höke Galerie, Düsseldorf: Markus Vater, biography, bibliography, works
 Studio Voltaire, London: 

1970 births
Living people
Alumni of the Royal College of Art
20th-century German painters
20th-century German male artists
German male painters
21st-century German painters
21st-century German male artists
Kunstakademie Düsseldorf alumni